The 1995–96 NBA season was the Pacers' 20th season in the National Basketball Association, and 29th season as a franchise. During the off-season, the Pacers signed free agents Ricky Pierce and Eddie Johnson. The team struggled with a 6–8 start to the season, as Rik Smits missed 19 games with an ankle injury. The Pacers were also involved in a brawl in a 119–95 home loss to the Sacramento Kings on November 10, 1995, with a total of 16 players, eight from each team suspended. However, the Pacers posted a 14–2 record in January, held a 31–16 record at the All-Star break, and later on won eight of their final nine games of the season. The team finished second in the Central Division with a 52–30 record.

Reggie Miller led the Pacers in scoring averaging 21.1 points per game, and was named to the All-NBA Third Team, and selected for the 1996 NBA All-Star Game, while Smits averaged 18.5 points and 6.9 rebounds per game. In addition, Derrick McKey provided the team with 11.7 points per game, and was selected to the NBA All-Defensive Second Team, while Dale Davis provided with 10.3 points, 9.1 rebounds and 1.4 blocks per game, and Mark Jackson contributed 10.0 points and 7.8 assists per game. Off the bench, Pierce contributed 9.7 points per game, while sixth man Antonio Davis averaged 8.8 points and 6.1 rebounds per game, and Johnson contributed 7.7 points per game. The Pacers were also the only team in the league to beat the Chicago Bulls twice during their historic 72–10 season, with a 103–97 home win on December 26, 1995, and a 100–99 road win on April 20, 1996. However, during the final month of the regular season, Miller suffered an eye socket injury.

Without Miller, the Pacers struggled in the Eastern Conference First Round of the playoffs against the 6th-seeded Atlanta Hawks. Pierce, who usually plays a sixth man role off the bench, became the team's starting shooting guard in Miller's absence. With the series tied at 2–2, Miller would return to play in Game 5 scoring 29 points, while wearing protective eye goggles, but the Pacers would lose to the Hawks at home, 89–87.

Following the season, Jackson and Pierce were both traded to the Denver Nuggets.

Offseason

Draft picks

Roster

Regular season

Season standings

z – clinched division title
y – clinched division title
x – clinched playoff spot

Record vs. opponents

Game log

Regular season

|- align="center" bgcolor="#ccffcc"
| 1
| November 3, 1995
| @ Atlanta
| W 111–106
|
|
|
| The Omni
| 1–0
|- align="center" bgcolor="#ccffcc"
| 2
| November 4, 1995
| Toronto
| W 97–89
|
|
|
| Market Square Arena
| 2–0
|- align="center" bgcolor="#ccffcc"
| 3
| November 7, 1995
| @ Cleveland
| W 104–101
|
|
|
| Gund Arena
| 3–0
|- align="center" bgcolor="#ffcccc"
| 4
| November 9, 1995
| @ New York
| L 95–103
|
|
|
| Madison Square Garden
| 3–1
|- align="center" bgcolor="#ffcccc"
| 5
| November 10, 1995
| Sacramento
| L 95–119
|
|
|
| Market Square Arena
| 3–2
|- align="center" bgcolor="#ccffcc"
| 6
| November 15, 1995
| @ Miami
| W 103–97
|
|
|
| Miami Arena
| 4–2
|- align="center" bgcolor="#ffcccc"
| 7
| November 16, 1995
| @ Orlando
| L 80–89
|
|
|
| Orlando Arena
| 4–3
|- align="center" bgcolor="#ccffcc"
| 8
| November 18, 1995
| Seattle
| W 118–104
|
|
|
| Market Square Arena
| 5–3
|- align="center" bgcolor="#ffcccc"
| 9
| November 23, 1995
| Houston
| L 108–115
|
|
|
| Market Square Arena
| 5–4
|- align="center" bgcolor="#ffcccc"
| 10
| November 24, 1995
| Cleveland
| L 93–100
|
|
|
| Market Square Arena
| 5–5
|- align="center" bgcolor="#ccffcc"
| 11
| November 28, 1995
| @ Seattle
| W 102–101
|
|
|
| KeyArena
| 6–5
|- align="center" bgcolor="#ffcccc"
| 12
| November 30, 1995
| @ Sacramento
| L 95–105
|
|
|
| ARCO Arena
| 6–6

|- align="center" bgcolor="#ffcccc"
| 13
| December 2, 1995
| @ Golden State
| L 97–100
|
|
|
| Oakland-Alameda County Coliseum Arena
| 6–7
|- align="center" bgcolor="#ffcccc"
| 14
| December 3, 1995
| @ L.A. Lakers
| L 96–104
|
|
|
| Great Western Forum
| 6–8
|- align="center" bgcolor="#ccffcc"
| 15
| December 5, 1995
| Philadelphia
| W 108–91
|
|
|
| Market Square Arena
| 7–8
|- align="center" bgcolor="#ffcccc"
| 16
| December 8, 1995
| @ New Jersey
| L 89–91
|
|
|
| Brendan Byrne Arena
| 7–9
|- align="center" bgcolor="#ccffcc"
| 17
| December 10, 1995
| L.A. Clippers
| W 111–104
|
|
|
| Market Square Arena
| 8–9
|- align="center" bgcolor="#ccffcc"
| 18
| December 12, 1995
| Denver
| W 125–92
|
|
|
| Market Square Arena
| 9–9
|- align="center" bgcolor="#ccffcc"
| 19
| December 14, 1995
| @ Toronto
| W 102–100
|
|
|
| SkyDome
| 10–9
|- align="center" bgcolor="#ccffcc"
| 20
| December 15, 1995
| Milwaukee
| W 112–95
|
|
|
| Market Square Arena
| 11–9
|- align="center" bgcolor="#ffcccc"
| 21
| December 17, 1995
| @ Milwaukee
| L 80–84
|
|
|
| Bradley Center
| 11–10
|- align="center" bgcolor="#ccffcc"
| 22
| December 20, 1995
| L.A. Lakers
| W 109–98
|
|
|
| Market Square Arena
| 12–10
|- align="center" bgcolor="#ccffcc"
| 23
| December 22, 1995
| Dallas
| W 90–79
|
|
|
| Market Square Arena
| 13–10
|- align="center" bgcolor="#ffcccc"
| 24
| December 23, 1995
| @ Cleveland
| L 96–97
|
|
|
| Gund Arena
| 13–11
|- align="center" bgcolor="#ccffcc"
| 25
| December 26, 1995
| Chicago
| W 103–97
|
|
|
| Market Square Arena
| 14–11
|- align="center" bgcolor="#ccffcc"
| 26
| December 28, 1995
| Miami
| W 91–77
|
|
|
| Market Square Arena
| 15–11
|- align="center" bgcolor="#ffcccc"
| 27
| December 29, 1995
| @ Chicago
| L 93–120
|
|
|
| United Center
| 15–12

|- align="center" bgcolor="#ccffcc"
| 28
| January 2, 1996
| @ Denver
| W 102–87
|
|
|
| McNichols Sports Arena
| 16–12
|- align="center" bgcolor="#ccffcc"
| 29
| January 3, 1996
| @ L.A. Clippers
| W 110–94
|
|
|
| Los Angeles Memorial Sports Arena
| 17–12
|- align="center" bgcolor="#ccffcc"
| 30
| January 5, 1996
| @ San Antonio
| W 105–92
|
|
|
| Alamodome
| 18–12
|- align="center" bgcolor="#ffcccc"
| 31
| January 6, 1996
| @ Houston
| L 87–99
|
|
|
| The Summit
| 18–13
|- align="center" bgcolor="#ccffcc"
| 32
| January 9, 1996
| @ Dallas
| W 91–84
|
|
|
| Reunion Arena
| 19–13
|- align="center" bgcolor="#ccffcc"
| 33
| January 11, 1996
| Milwaukee
| W 96–88
|
|
|
| Market Square Arena
| 20–13
|- align="center" bgcolor="#ccffcc"
| 34
| January 13, 1996
| Minnesota
| W 103–94
|
|
|
| Market Square Arena
| 21–13
|- align="center" bgcolor="#ccffcc"
| 35
| January 16, 1996
| @ Toronto
| W 110–102
|
|
|
| SkyDome
| 22–13
|- align="center" bgcolor="#ffcccc"
| 36
| January 17, 1996
| @ Atlanta
| L 93–102
|
|
|
| The Omni
| 22–14
|- align="center" bgcolor="#ccffcc"
| 37
| January 19, 1996
| Detroit
| W 89–81
|
|
|
| Market Square Arena
| 23–14
|- align="center" bgcolor="#ccffcc"
| 38
| January 21, 1996
| Washington
| W 106–96
|
|
|
| Market Square Arena
| 24–14
|- align="center" bgcolor="#ccffcc"
| 39
| January 23, 1996
| Phoenix
| W 117–102
|
|
|
| Market Square Arena
| 25–14
|- align="center" bgcolor="#ccffcc"
| 40
| January 24, 1996
| @ Milwaukee
| W 97–89
|
|
|
| Bradley Center
| 26–14
|- align="center" bgcolor="#ccffcc"
| 41
| January 26, 1996
| @ Boston
| W 107–90
|
|
|
| FleetCenter
| 27–14
|- align="center" bgcolor="#ccffcc"
| 42
| January 27, 1996
| Orlando
| W 102–79
|
|
|
| Market Square Arena
| 28–14
|- align="center" bgcolor="#ccffcc"
| 43
| January 30, 1996
| Atlanta
| W 107–90
|
|
|
| Market Square Arena
| 29–14

|- align="center" bgcolor="#ffcccc"
| 44
| February 1, 1996
| @ Detroit
| L 70–87
|
|
|
| The Palace of Auburn Hills
| 29–15
|- align="center" bgcolor="#ccffcc"
| 45
| February 2, 1996
| Boston
| W 116–108
|
|
|
| Market Square Arena
| 30–15
|- align="center" bgcolor="#ccffcc"
| 46
| February 4, 1996
| New York
| W 90–83
|
|
|
| Market Square Arena
| 31–15
|- align="center" bgcolor="#ffcccc"
| 47
| February 7, 1996
| @ Philadelphia
| L 101–102
|
|
|
| CoreStates Spectrum
| 31–16
|- align="center"
|colspan="9" bgcolor="#bbcaff"|All-Star Break
|- style="background:#cfc;"
|- bgcolor="#bbffbb"
|- align="center" bgcolor="#ffcccc"
| 48
| February 13, 1996
| New Jersey
| L 92–101
|
|
|
| Market Square Arena
| 31–17
|- align="center" bgcolor="#ffcccc"
| 49
| February 14, 1996
| @ New Jersey
| L 87–88
|
|
|
| Continental Airlines Arena
| 31–18
|- align="center" bgcolor="#ccffcc"
| 50
| February 16, 1996
| @ Washington
| W 95–94
|
|
|
| Baltimore Arena
| 32–18
|- align="center" bgcolor="#ffcccc"
| 51
| February 18, 1996
| Chicago
| L 102–110
|
|
|
| Market Square Arena
| 32–19
|- align="center" bgcolor="#ffcccc"
| 52
| February 21, 1996
| Orlando
| L 97–99
|
|
|
| Market Square Arena
| 32–20
|- align="center" bgcolor="#ccffcc"
| 53
| February 23, 1996
| Philadelphia
| W 102–95
|
|
|
| Market Square Arena
| 33–20
|- align="center" bgcolor="#ccffcc"
| 54
| February 24, 1996
| @ Charlotte
| W 104–90
|
|
|
| Charlotte Coliseum
| 34–20
|- align="center" bgcolor="#ccffcc"
| 55
| February 26, 1996
| @ Boston
| W 122–119 (OT)
|
|
|
| FleetCenter
| 35–20
|- align="center" bgcolor="#ccffcc"
| 56
| February 27, 1996
| Portland
| W 101–87
|
|
|
| Market Square Arena
| 36–20
|- align="center" bgcolor="#ccffcc"
| 57
| February 29, 1996
| Golden State
| W 94–85
|
|
|
| Market Square Arena
| 37–20

|- align="center" bgcolor="#ccffcc"
| 58
| March 3, 1996
| Charlotte
| W 103–100
|
|
|
| Market Square Arena
| 38–20
|- align="center" bgcolor="#ffcccc"
| 59
| March 5, 1996
| @ Phoenix
| L 95–108
|
|
|
| America West Arena
| 38–21
|- align="center" bgcolor="#ffcccc"
| 60
| March 6, 1996
| @ Utah
| L 94–101
|
|
|
| Delta Center
| 38–22
|- align="center" bgcolor="#ccffcc"
| 61
| March 8, 1996
| @ Vancouver
| W 94–80
|
|
|
| General Motors Place
| 39–22
|- align="center" bgcolor="#ffcccc"
| 62
| March 10, 1996
| @ Portland
| L 108–113 (2OT)
|
|
|
| Rose Garden
| 39–23
|- align="center" bgcolor="#ffcccc"
| 63
| March 15, 1996
| Utah
| L 86–95
|
|
|
| Market Square Arena
| 39–24
|- align="center" bgcolor="#ccffcc"
| 64
| March 17, 1996
| Toronto
| W 105–96
|
|
|
| Market Square Arena
| 40–24
|- align="center" bgcolor="#ffcccc"
| 65
| March 19, 1996
| @ Charlotte
| L 94–102
|
|
|
| Charlotte Coliseum
| 40–25
|- align="center" bgcolor="#ffcccc"
| 66
| March 20, 1996
| @ New York
| L 99–102
|
|
|
| Madison Square Garden
| 40–26
|- align="center" bgcolor="#ccffcc"
| 67
| March 22, 1996
| Vancouver
| W 111–94
|
|
|
| Market Square Arena
| 41–26
|- align="center" bgcolor="#ffcccc"
| 68
| March 24, 1996
| San Antonio
| L 88–100
|
|
|
| Market Square Arena
| 41–27
|- align="center" bgcolor="#ccffcc"
| 69
| March 26, 1996
| Boston
| W 103–96
|
|
|
| Market Square Arena
| 42–27
|- align="center" bgcolor="#ccffcc"
| 70
| March 27, 1996
| @ Washington
| W 99–93
|
|
|
| USAir Arena
| 43–27
|- align="center" bgcolor="#ffcccc"
| 71
| March 29, 1996
| @ Minnesota
| L 91–93
|
|
|
| Target Center
| 43–28
|- align="center" bgcolor="#ccffcc"
| 72
| March 31, 1996
| New Jersey
| W 118–100
|
|
|
| Market Square Arena
| 44–28

|- align="center" bgcolor="#ffcccc"
| 73
| April 2, 1996
| New York
| L 86–90
|
|
|
| Market Square Arena
| 44–29
|- align="center" bgcolor="#ccffcc"
| 74
| April 3, 1996
| @ Philadelphia
| W 102–87
|
|
|
| CoreStates Spectrum
| 45–29
|- align="center" bgcolor="#ccffcc"
| 75
| April 6, 1996
| Miami
| W 99–95
|
|
|
| Market Square Arena
| 46–29
|- align="center" bgcolor="#ccffcc"
| 76
| April 8, 1996
| Atlanta
| W 97–95
|
|
|
| Market Square Arena
| 47–29
|- align="center" bgcolor="#ccffcc"
| 77
| April 12, 1996
| @ Orlando
| W 111–101
|
|
|
| Orlando Arena
| 48–29
|- align="center" bgcolor="#ccffcc"
| 78
| April 13, 1996
| Detroit
| W 91–86
|
|
|
| Market Square Arena
| 49–29
|- align="center" bgcolor="#ccffcc"
| 79
| April 15, 1996
| Charlotte
| W 90–87
|
|
|
| Market Square Arena
| 50–29
|- align="center" bgcolor="#ffcccc"
| 80
| April 17, 1996
| @ Detroit
| L 93–102
|
|
|
| The Palace of Auburn Hills
| 50–30
|- align="center" bgcolor="#ccffcc"
| 81
| April 20, 1996
| @ Chicago
| W 100–99
|
|
|
| United Center
| 51–30
|- align="center" bgcolor="#ccffcc"
| 82
| April 21, 1996
| Cleveland
| W 89–88
|
|
|
| Market Square Arena
| 52–30

Playoffs

|- align="center" bgcolor="#ffcccc"
| 1
| April 25, 1996
| Atlanta
| L 80–92
| Smits (19)
| D. Davis (12)
| Pierce (5)
| Market Square Arena16,438
| 0–1
|- align="center" bgcolor="#ccffcc"
| 2
| April 27, 1996
| Atlanta
| W 102–94 (OT)
| Smits (29)
| D. Davis (12)
| Jackson (9)
| Market Square Arena16,709
| 1–1
|- align="center" bgcolor="#ffcccc"
| 3
| April 29, 1996
| @ Atlanta
| L 83–90
| McKey, Smits (13)
| D. Davis (10)
| Jackson (6)
| Omni Coliseum11,290
| 1–2
|- align="center" bgcolor="#ccffcc"
| 4
| May 2, 1996
| @ Atlanta
| W 83–75
| Smits (17)
| D. Davis, Smits (9)
| Jackson (5)
| Omni Coliseum15,482
| 2–2
|- align="center" bgcolor="#ffcccc"
| 5
| May 5, 1996
| Atlanta
| L 87–89
| Miller (29)
| D. Davis (13)
| Jackson (8)
| Market Square Arena16,731
| 2–3
|-

Player statistics

Season

Playoffs

Player Statistics Citation:

Awards and records
 Reggie Miller, NBA All-Star Game
 Reggie Miller, All-NBA Third Team
 Derrick McKey, NBA All-Defensive Second Team

Transactions

Overview

Player Transactions Citation:

References

See also
 1995–96 NBA season

Indiana Pacers seasons
Pace
Pace
Indiana